Orodara Airport  is a public use airport located 1 nm northwest of Orodara, Kénédougou, Burkina Faso.

See also
List of airports in Burkina Faso

References

External links 
 Airport record for Orodara Airport at Landings.com

Airports in Burkina Faso
Kénédougou Province